Aung Aung Taik is a Burmese artist and one of the pioneers of modern art in Burma.

Early life and education
Born in Rangoon, Burma in 1948, he received the traditional education of his class. Following boarding school he decided not to follow in his father's footsteps through medical school, but rather chose to study painting. He attended the State Academy of Art in Rangoon and took private lessons from two of Burma's leading artists, U Ba Kyi and U Ngwe Gaing. His mentors, the writers Ludu U Hla and his wife Daw Amar introduced him to the world of letters and philosophy. He accompanied them on a number of anthropological expeditions into the remote regions of Burma and illustrated a series of books published by Ludu U Hla. He had successful exhibits of his work in Burma and Japan but as his work moved in an abstract philosophical direction the government put increasing pressure on him to conform to representational forms and heroic socialist subject matter.

In the United States
Wanting more artistic freedom he immigrated to the United States in 1972 and continued his studies at the San Francisco Art Institute. A series of exhibitions led to his first one-man show in the United States in 1981, where Tom Albright commented in the San Francisco Chronicle that Aung Aung's paintings “...suggest some of the strange stage sets of Francis Bacon carried to a greater degree of abstraction...”

Concepts
Fascinated by the act of dissection, Aung Aung Taik's later mixed media works are the result of a deep curiosity regarding the study and comprehension of the source of life and the death that follows.

Writing
Intense engagement with the diversity of cultural life in the San Francisco of the 80s led him to a mastery of the English language and the desire to express himself in poetry and prose. His autobiographical novel Visions of Shwedagon in which he wrote of art, love, death and religious contemplation along with a deep devotion to his home country was published in 1989. A renewed interest in the Theravada tradition of Buddhism native to his homeland led to a series of sculptural representations of the Buddha and the essay, A View from the Lower Life' (1992).
An accomplished cook, he wrote Under the Golden Pagoda - The Best of Burmese Cooking'', an early introduction of Burmese cuisine to the West.
Aung Aung Taik became an American citizen in 1994.

Return to Burma

In 2001 he returned to Burma to paint, and had his first solo exhibition there after 30 years in America.
He has returned annually and has had one man shows and group shows in Rangoon and Mandalay. He conducts art workshops and forums at the Htanyeiknyo Art Center in Mandalay.

Aung Aung Taik is a member of a group of Burmese modern artists called the New Zero Art Group as well as the founder of [Friends of Myanmar Arts], a non-profit organization formed to benefit the arts community in Burma.

Selected events

 1964 State Annual Art Exhibition, Envoy Hall, Rangoon, Burma.
 1968 State Annual Art Exhibition, Jubilee Hall, Rangoon, Burma.
 1969 Private exhibition, sponsored by Mr. and Mrs. Olson of Pan American Airlines, Rangoon, Burma.
 1969 Exhibition sponsored by Mr. and Mrs. H. Sewell, Military Attaché, U.S. Embassy, Rangoon, Burma.
 1970 Expo '70, Osaka Trade Fair, Japan.
 1970 Exhibition of Burmese Paintings, Alliance Francaise Rangoon, Burma.
 1972 Annual Art Exhibition, Mandalay Town Hall, Mandalay, Burma.
 1972 Galleria Heller, San Francisco, California.
 1973 The Addison Greene Gallery, New York, New York.
 1974 The Metzer Krasnow Gallery, Scarsdale, New York.
 1977 Capricorn Asunder Gallery Group Show, San Francisco, California.
 1980 Fukuoka Konnichino, Bijujsuten, Japan.
 1981 One man show a~ Galleria Museo: Mission Cultural Center, San Francisco, California.
 1987 Represented Myanmar at the National Poetry Week Festival, San Francisco, California.
 1988 Native Symbols: An Exhibition of Drawings on Ceramic Plates, M. Sanchez Gallery, San Francisco, California.
 1989 The Poet as Artist- Artist as Poet: An art exhibition sponsored by the National Poetry Association, San Francisco, California.
 1989 Represented Myanmar at the National Poetry Week Festival, San Francisco, California
 1990 Group show, Fort Mason Art center.
 1990 Represented Myanmar at the "Poetry from the Pacific Rim"-San Francisco, California.
 1990 Painted three 30x40 foot paintings for the National Poetry Association at Fort Mason-San Francisco, California
 1997 Pleasure of the Palettes-Group show-Phoenix Arizona.
 2001 One man show-Htan Yeik Nyo Art Center-Mandalay, Myanmar
 2004 Group show-Fresno Art Museum.
 2007 New Zero Group show-Beikthanoe Art Gallery, Yangon Myanmar.
 2008 Burma Now: Photo Show. -San Francisco Furniture Mart.
 2008 Group Show-Beikthanoe Art Gallery, Yangon, Myanmar.
 2009 Fresno Art Museum-One man show.
 2009 Asean Contemporary Art Exchange Exhibition, Yangon, Myanmar.
 2009 Aung Aung Taik-Gustavo Rivera : Golda Art Space.
 2009 Artist in Residence in Yangon, Myanmar conducting workshops and seminars.
 2010 Installation Exhibition- Aung Aung Taik and Aye Ko- New Zero Art Space
 2010 From 64 to 71 exh, Hong Kong
 2011 Paper, Scissor and Glue- Bryant Street Gallery- Palo Alto Ca.
 2011 Poetry in the Garden-Solo Reading- UC Davis, Ca.
 2011 Losing Count- Galaria de la Raza- San Francisco.
 2011 International Art Show for Peace-Losing Count- Zacatecas, Mexico.

References

External links
 Aung Aung Taik
 Friends of Myanmar Arts

Burmese artists
Modern artists
1948 births
People from Yangon
Living people
Contemporary artists
Burmese sculptors
Buddhist artists